Cul-de-sac is a 1966 British black comedy psychological thriller film directed by Roman Polanski, written by Polanski and Gérard Brach, and starring Donald Pleasence, Françoise Dorléac, Lionel Stander, Jack MacGowran, Iain Quarrier, Geoffrey Sumner, Renée Houston, William Franklyn, Trevor Delaney, and Marie Kean. It also features Jacqueline Bisset (credited as Jackie Bisset) in a small role, in her second film appearance. Polanski's second English-language feature, it follows two injured American gangsters who take refuge in the remote island castle of a young British couple in the north of England, spurring a series of mind games and violent altercations.

The black and white cinematography is by Gil Taylor.

Plot
Gruff American gangster Dickey pushes his broken-down car along a causeway through rising seawater while his eccentric companion Albie lies inside, bleeding from a gunshot wound after a bungled robbery. Cut off by the unexpected rising tide, they are on the only road to a bleak and remote tidal island (Lindisfarne in Northumberland), where, in a dark castle on a hilltop, a deeply neurotic and effeminate middle-aged Englishman named George lives with his second wife, the young and promiscuous Teresa. Dickey breaks into the castle and telephones his underworld boss, Katelbach, to send someone to get him and Albie. He then disconnects the phone lines and proceeds to hold the couple hostage while awaiting the arrival of Katelbach the next day.

When Albie dies from his injuries, Dickey forces Teresa and George to dig his grave. They then hold a wake, with Dickey and George getting drunk together on the beach while Teresa swims nude in the ocean. The next morning, a car approaches the castle – but instead of Katelbach, it turns out to be some of George's obnoxious friends who have showed up at the castle unannounced. Dickey poses as a servant while Teresa begins to flirt with one of the guests, Cecil, and George does his best to get rid of the guests as quickly as possible. Cecil leaves quickly, forgetting his hunting rifle in the hall; however, it is unloaded and there is no ammunition for it, rendering it useless.

Teresa steals Dickey's pistol from his coat pocket and gives it to George. Dickey eventually gets word that his boss Katelbach is not going to come and prepares to take George's car to drive to the mainland by causeway. George refuses, and a fight ensues. George fatally shoots Dickey with his own gun. Before dying, Dickey manages to retrieve his tommy gun from his broken-down car, which he had hidden away in the chicken house. Too weak to fire the gun at George, Dickey collapses to the ground and the automatic discharge from the weapon causes George's car to explode in flames. Fearful of being implicated in the killing (and of possible reprisals from Katelbach's other henchmen), Teresa frantically insists that she and George abandon the castle together. But George is in a state of shock and seems unable to move. Suddenly, they hear a car approaching. Not knowing that Dickey's boss had abandoned him, they assume it is Katelbach. Desperate and afraid, Teresa runs off by herself and hides in a cupboard. The car arrives, and it turns out to be Cecil, who had returned to retrieve his rifle. Cecil offers to take them to the police, but George refuses to go. He watches as Cecil and Teresa drive off into the night, leaving George in his ruined castle with his car still on fire.

Now utterly alone, George goes on a rampage, running out of the castle and down to the beach. As day breaks, he finally sits down on a rock in the fetal position and weeps hysterically, shouting out the name of his first wife, as the early morning tide rises around him.

Cast

Production
The film was shot on location in 1965 on the island of Lindisfarne (also known as Holy Island) off the coast of Northumberland, England. Lindisfarne Castle, which served as the home in the film, is now a National Trust property and can be toured by the public; despite the passage of time, the building and its surroundings are largely unchanged.

Interpretation
Like Polanski's previous film Repulsion, released the previous year, it explores themes of horror, frustrated sexuality and alienation, which have become characteristic of many of the director's films, especially Rosemary's Baby and The Tenant.

Cul-de-sac has been compared in tone and theme with the works of Samuel Beckett and Harold Pinter, and these similarities are underscored by the casting of two principal roles in the film: Jack MacGowran was renowned for his stage performances of Beckett's plays and Donald Pleasence originated the role of Davies in Pinter's The Caretaker. The film's German title is Wenn Katelbach kommt (When Katelbach Comes). Christopher Weedman also notes the film's similarities with "such hard-edged Humphrey Bogart hostage thrillers as The Petrified Forest (Archie Mayo, 1936), Key Largo (John Huston, 1948), and The Desperate Hours (William Wyler, 1955)."

Awards and reputation
Cul-de-sac was awarded the 1966 Golden Bear at the 16th Berlin International Film Festival.

Cul-de-sac currently (May 2020) holds an 83% approval rating on the film review aggregator Rotten Tomatoes, based on 23 reviews.

See also

 List of films featuring home invasions

References

Bibliography

External links
 
 
 
 
 Cul-de-sac – an article by Christopher Weedman at Senses of Cinema
 Cul-de-sac: High Tides – an essay by David Thompson at the Criterion Collection

1966 films
1966 comedy-drama films
1966 independent films
1966 thriller films
1960s comedy thriller films
1960s English-language films
1960s psychological thriller films
1960s thriller drama films
British black-and-white films
British comedy-drama films
British comedy thriller films
British independent films
British psychological thriller films
British thriller drama films
Films directed by Roman Polanski
Films scored by Krzysztof Komeda
Films set in castles
Films set on islands
Films shot in Northumberland
Films with screenplays by Gérard Brach
Films with screenplays by Roman Polanski
Golden Bear winners
Home invasions in film
Lindisfarne
1960s British films